Gemmula disjuncta is an extinct species of sea snail, a marine gastropod mollusk in the family Turridae, the turrids.

Description

Distribution
Fossils of this marine species have been found in New Zealand.

References

 laws, C. R. (1936). The Waitotaran faunule at Kaawa Creek - Part 1. Transactions of the Royal Society of New Zealand. 66: 38–59.
 Maxwell, P.A. (2009). Cenozoic Mollusca. pp 232–254 in Gordon, D.P. (ed.) New Zealand inventory of biodiversity. Volume one. Kingdom Animalia: Radiata, Lophotrochozoa, Deuterostomia. Canterbury University Press, Christchurch

disjuncta
Gastropods described in 1936
Gastropods of New Zealand